The men's 20 kilometres walk event at the 2014 Asian Games was held on the streets of Incheon, South Korea on 28 September.

Schedule
All times are Korea Standard Time (UTC+09:00)

Records

Results 
Legend
DSQ — Disqualified

References

Final results

Walk 20 kilometres men
2014 men 20km